The Silas Cox House, at 85 S. 400 East in Beaver, Utah, is a historic house built around 1901.  It was listed on the National Register of Historic Places in 1983.
	
It is a one-and-a-half-story brick L-shaped house with an unusual entrance inset at the joint of the L.

It was built by Silas Cox, who bought the property in 1892, and who made and burned all the brick for the home.

References

Houses on the National Register of Historic Places in Utah
Victorian architecture in Utah
Houses completed in 1901
Beaver County, Utah